Marlborough House School is a co-educational preparatory school situated in  of countryside in Hawkhurst, Kent. The school currently has just over 260 pupils between the ages of 2.5 and 13 with a teaching staff of 60. Marlborough House is predominantly a day school, but operates a flexi-boarding policy for pupils over the age of eight. The school is a member of the Independent Association of Preparatory Schools (IAPS).

Classes up to Year 4 have teaching assistants. The pupil teacher ratio in the school's Pre-Prep (Reception - Year 2) is 1:6 and in Years 3-4 it is 1:9.

The school's sporting and cocurricular facilities include a full size sports hall, a swimming pool, an astroturf, tennis courts, an outdoor classroom, Forest School areas, a shooting range, an observatory and a pitch and putt golf course.

The current Head is Eddy Newton. Prior to becoming Headmaster of Marlborough House School, Mr Newton was Chief Executive of The Cothill Trust and held the position of Chairman of the Independent Association of Prep Schools. Before this, Mr Newton was Headmaster of Chafyn Grove School and Headmaster Felsted School.

The school is inspected by the Independent Schools Inspectorate and their last inspection was in 2015.

History
In 1874, Mrs Sophia Lombe White opened a small boarding school for boys aged 8–13 on the Sussex Coast in a building named Marlborough House. This was the predecessor of today’s Marlborough House School.

The school has four houses: Awdry, Dunbar, Egan and Hawkings, named after the first Marlborough House School families who lost a son in the Great War. 
 
In 1930, the founding White family purchased the New Lodge estate in Hawkhurst from the Hardcastle family, and moved the school to the school's present site. They also adopted the Hardcastle family crest, which remains the school crest.

The core of the school remains the ‘main building’ – an 18th century country house. This building has adapted for 21st century schooling and complemented with new buildings such as Pre-Prep, the Harrison Building and the Sports Hall. The school's grounds have also been updated in recent years with the addition of an outdoor swimming pool, shooting range, Forest School, play areas, an astroturf and tennis courts.

Notable alumni
Rev. W. V. Awdry, author of Thomas the Tank Engine
David Gower, former England cricket captain
Stephen Poliakoff, acclaimed playwright, director and scriptwriter
Peter Vansittart, novelist.

External links 
 School Website
 Profile on the Independent Schools Council website

Preparatory schools in Kent
Hawkhurst
Educational institutions established in 1874
1874 establishments in England